Feels Like Home is an 2022 Indian Hindi-language Comedy drama streaming web series directed by Sahir Raza. The series is created and produced by Sidhanta Mathur under the banner of Writeous Studios. This series stars Anshuman Malhotra, Mihir Ahuja, Preet Kammani and Vishnu Kaushal in the lead alongside Himika Bose and Inayat Sood. The series premiered on Lionsgate Play on 10 June 2022. A second season premiered on the service on 7 October 2022.

Cast 
 Anshuman Malhotra
 Mihir Ahuja
 Preet Kammani
 Vishnu Kaushal
 Himika Bose 
 Inayat Sood
 Dolly Singh
 Garvit Pruthi
 Leah Khambata
 Surbhi Dhyani
 Arun Singh
 Meher Acharia-Dar
 Diksha Sharma Raina
 Subroto Bhattacharjee

Episodes

Series overview

Season 1

Season 2

Production

Casting 
Sidhanta Mathur approached Prit Kamani, Anshuman Malhotra, Vishnu Kaushal and Mihir Ahuja to star in the series.

Development
The series was announced by Lionsgate Play on 25 August 2021.

Release
The trailer of the series was released on 25 May 2022.  The first season consisting of six episodes premiered on Lionsgate Play on 10 June 2022.

References

External links
 
 Feels Like Home on Lionsgate Play

Hindi-language web series
Comedy-drama web series
2022 web series debuts